"Keeping the Dream Alive" is a 1988 song by German pop and rock band Münchener Freiheit – also known as Freiheit in English-speaking countries – taken from their album Fantasy. The music was written by Aron Strobel and Stefan Zauner with lyrics by Timothy Touchton and Curtis Briggs, and the song was arranged by Andrew Powell, Armand Volker and Stefan Zauner. It was recorded in Abbey Road Studios and mastered by Tonstudio Rico Sonderegger, with Volker as the producer. The performance by Münchener Freiheit with the London Symphony Orchestra included featuring additional vocals by the Jackson Singers.

The song was originally recorded in German as "So lang' man Träume noch leben kann", and appeared on the album Fantasie. The lyrics were later translated into English and re-recorded to be released on CBS. 

An instrumental version under the original German-language title "So lang' man Träume noch leben kann" appeared in 1987 on Schenk Mir Eine Nacht - Ihre Schönsten Lovesongs.

Charts
It remains the band's only international hit, peaking at #14 in the UK Charts. Because it is the only charting hit of the band in the UK, it is generally considered as a one-hit wonder.

Tracklist

German
Side A: So lang’ man Träume noch leben kann" (Long Version) (6:58)
Side B:
"So lang’ man Träume noch leben kann" (Instrumental Version) (4:14)
"So lang’ man Träume noch leben kann" (Single Version) (4:14)

English
Single
Side A: "Keeping the Dream Alive" (Single Version) (4:09)
Side B: "The Land of Fantasy" (4:51)

Maxi single
"Keeping the Dream Alive" (Single Version) (4:09)
"Keeping the Dream Alive" (Extended Version) (6:31)
"The Land of Fantasy" (4:51)

Popularity
Due to its December release and rich orchestral sound, "Keeping the Dream Alive" still receives much airplay at Christmas time in the United Kingdom, and can be found on many Christmas compilation albums. It is also very popular with choirs throughout the world. 

The song failed to chart in the United States when it was originally released, gaining favour with the American public only after it was featured in the soundtrack for the movie Say Anything.... The single has received additional exposure in the United States thanks to the singing talent contest American Idol on the Fox television network. The song has been used in various seasons of the show as a backdrop to video montages featuring contestants on the programme. In season 9 of the show, the Top 12 finalists performed it on Idol Gives Back.

Covers and remixes
There have been a number of covers of the song both in English and in German. The German version "So lang' man Träume noch leben kann" include those by Erkan Aki (2001), the Blassportgruppe (2010), and Annett Louisan (2016) and Heinz Rudolf Kunze (2016).

In 2008, the song was remixed on the 2008 edition of Essential Summer Remixes by the Summer Remixers and released by Music Factory Entertainment Group, Ltd.

The classic music band Adoro, made up of Peter Dasch (bass-baritone), Nico Müller (baritone), Jandy Ganguly (baritone), Assaf Kacholi (lyric tenor) and Laszlo Maleczky (tenor),  presented a classical cover on their 2012 album Träume.

In 2013, English pop singer Kim Wilde covered it on her album Wilde Winter Songbook, but only in the deluxe edition of the album.

In 2018, British pop music group The Fizz covered it in their album Christmas with the Fizz.

In 2019, Björn Again covered the song in "Christmas Is Björn Again".

In popular culture
The song was featured on the soundtrack of the 1989 movie Say Anything... directed by Cameron Crowe.

It has also been the long-running background music to John Laws' introduction comments in his John Laws Morning Show in Sydney, Australia.

References

1988 songs
1988 singles
Christmas songs